"Without a Face" is a song by American rap metal band Rage Against the Machine from their second studio album Evil Empire (1996).

Background
"Without a Face" discusses the hardships faced by Mexican immigrants when moving to the United States, and how the U.S. government was building a wall at the border between itself and Mexico to stop the immigrants coming in. 

The title references the fact that many Mexican immigrants in the U.S. go unnoticed: they don't have signs on their backs, identification or rights, and are treated as one mass of nameless people. As such, they can be thought of as "without a face". The chorus (Walk unseen past the graves and the gates / Born without a face / One motive, no hope, uh / Born without a face) refers to the Zapatista people of Chiapas, who were unrepresented and ignored by the Institutional Revolutionary Party (PRI) controlled Mexican government, but also broadly to other peoples hurt by the North American Free Trade Agreement (NAFTA).

References

Rage Against the Machine songs
Songs written by Zack de la Rocha
1996 songs